The Cook Islands women's national under-17 football team is the national U-17 team of the Cook Islands and is controlled by the Cook Islands Football Association. With a population of around 24,000 people it remains one of the smallest FIFA teams.

History
The Cook Islands participated two times so far in the OFC U-17 Women's Championship, in 2012 and in 2016. In 2012 they managed to reach the third place, out of four participants. Tepaeru Toka was the big star as she managed to score three goals during that tournament. She also scored the Cook Islands first goal ever, in a 3–2 loss against Papua New Guinea. In 2016 they participated again. This time was less successful as they became third in the group and therefore missed qualification for the semi-final. Moeroa Harmon however managed to gain some recognition as she managed to score a hattrick in a 5–1 victory against Vanuatu.

Competition Record

OFC
The OFC Women's Under 17 Qualifying Tournament is a tournament held once every two years to decide the only qualification spot for Oceania Football Confederation (OFC) and representatives at the FIFA U-17 World Cup.

Current technical staff

Current squad
The following players were called up for the 2017 OFC U-16 Women's Championship

Caps and goals correct after match against New Zealand on August 15, 2017.

Squad for the 2016 OFC U-17 Women's Championship

Caps and goals correct after match against Vanuatu on January 18, 2016.

Squad for the 2012 OFC Women's Under 17 Qualifying Tournament

|-----
! colspan="9" bgcolor="#007c48" align="left" |
|----- bgcolor="#007c48"

|-----
! colspan="9" bgcolor="#007c48" align="left" |
|----- bgcolor="#007c48"

|-----
! colspan="9" bgcolor="#007c48" align="left" |
|----- bgcolor="#007c48"

See also
 Cook Islands women's national football team
 Cook Islands men's national football team
 Cook Islands men's national under-20 football team
 Cook Islands men's national under-17 football team

References

External links
Cook Islands Football Federation official website

WU
Women's national under-17 association football teams